Hollywood Casino St. Louis is a casino in Maryland Heights, Missouri, near St. Louis.  It is owned by Gaming and Leisure Properties and operated by Penn Entertainment.  The casino has  of gaming space, with 2,180 slot machines and 91 table games.

Penn National Gaming (now Penn Entertainment) acquired the casino, then named Harrah's St. Louis, in November 2012 from Caesars Entertainment for $610 million.

See also
List of casinos in Missouri

References

External links

Casinos in Missouri
Hotels in Missouri
Riverboat casinos
Buildings and structures in St. Louis County, Missouri
Tourist attractions in St. Louis County, Missouri
1997 establishments in Missouri